The 1978 Torneo Descentralizado, the top category of Peruvian football (soccer), was played by 16 teams. The national champion was Alianza Lima.

The season was divided into 2 stages. A Preliminary Tournament contested in two groups; this was a friendly tournament to keep teams occupied as the National Team was preparing for the 1978 World Cup Finals. The second stage was the Decentralized (league tournament); the top 2 qualified for Copa Libertadores and the last team was relegated.

Teams

Results

Preliminary Tournament - Northern Group

Preliminary Tournament - Southern Group

Final group

Torneo Descentralizado

Standings

Title

External links
RSSSF Peru 1978

Peru
Tor
Peruvian Primera División seasons